Richard Dana Fairbank (born September 18, 1950) is an American billionaire businessman who founded Capital One with Nigel Morris in 1988. He previously served on the board of directors of MasterCard International from 2004 through 2006. He is a member of the Stanford Business School advisory council, the Financial Services Roundtable, and the board of directors of the BITS Technology Forum.

Fairbank has been awarded "Business Leader of the Year" by Washingtonian, and placed on lists including Worth's list of the top 10 CEOs and "50 Best CEOs".

Education
Fairbank enrolled at Pomona College before transferring to Stanford University, where he earned a bachelor's degree in economics from Stanford University in 1972. He later earned an MBA from the Stanford Graduate School of Business in 1981, where he graduated first in his class. He also received the Excellence in Leadership award from Stanford University in 2006.

Career
While CEO of Capital One Financial in 2009, Fairbank earned a total compensation of $6,076,805, which included no base salary, no cash bonus, $2,000,019 in stock awards, $4,000,001 in option awards, and $76,785 in other compensation. In 2012, Fairbank's total compensation was $22.6 million. Fairbank has received a base salary of zero dollars since 1997.

In January 2018, with Capital One's share price reaching a record high, Fairbank's net worth rose to about $1.1 billion.

Personal life
Fairbank is married to Chris, and they have eight children.

They own and live at Overlook Farm, near Gunston Hall on the Potomac River in Virginia.

See also
One-dollar salary

References

External links
 Profile at CapitalOne.com
 Article about Fairbanks in Stanford Business magazine
 Profile at Forbes.com
 Profile at the Stanford Business School

American chief executives of financial services companies
American bankers
American corporate directors
1950 births
Living people
Pomona College alumni
Stanford University School of Humanities and Sciences alumni
Stanford Graduate School of Business alumni
American billionaires
Washington Capitals owners
Washington Mystics owners
Washington Wizards owners
Women's National Basketball Association executives
National Hockey League executives
National Hockey League owners
National Basketball Association executives
National Basketball Association owners